Bouches-du-Rhône ("Mouths of the Rhône") is a department in Southern France. It borders Vaucluse to the north, Gard to the west and Var to the east. The Mediterranean Sea lies to the south. Its prefecture and largest city is Marseille; other important cities include Aix-en-Provence, Arles, Martigues and Aubagne.

Marseille, France's second-largest city, has one of the largest container ports in the country. It prizes itself as France's oldest city, founded by Greek settlers from Phocaea around 600 BC. Bouches-du-Rhône is the most populous department of the Provence-Alpes-Côte d'Azur region, with 2,043,110 inhabitants as of 2019. Its INSEE and postal code is 13.

History 

The history of the area is closely linked to that of Provence. Marseille has been an important harbour since before Julius Caesar's conquest of Gaul. The Roman presence left numerous monuments across the department. Notable people born in the area include Romantic painter Camille Roqueplan and his brother, journalist and theatre director Nestor Roqueplan.

Bouches-du-Rhône is one of the original 83 departments created during the French Revolution on 4 March 1790. It was created from the western part of the former province of Provence and the principalities of Orange, Martigues and Lambesc. It lost part of its territory in 1793, including Orange and Apt, when the department of Vaucluse was created.

Following its creation, the department strongly supported the French Revolution, containing 90 Jacobin Clubs by 1794. It was also noteworthy that more than half of the priests in the department accepted the Civil Constitution of the Clergy, which in effect subordinated the church to the government. During the ascendancy of the French Communist Party in the 20th century, election results showed that support for left-wing politics remained relatively strong there, especially in the northern suburbs of Marseille.

Geography

Natural regions

The department is part of the current region of Provence-Alpes-Côte d'Azur. It is surrounded by the departments of Gard on the west, Vaucluse on the north and Var on the east, as well as by the Mediterranean Sea on the south. The Rhône river delta forms a vast swampy wetlands area called the Camargue in the southwestern part of the department. The Rove Tunnel, the world's longest canal tunnel from Marseille to the Étang de Berre, as well as smaller canals further west, allowed for waterway transport from Marseille to the Rhône until 1963, when the Rove Tunnel closed to traffic.

Bouches-du-Rhône is bordered by the rivers Rhône to the west and Durance to the north. The Rhône divides into the Grand Rhône and Petit Rhône south of Arles; the area between forms the Camargue. The principal mountains of the department are the Sainte-Baume massif (1,042 metres – 3,418 feet), Montagne Sainte-Victoire (1,011 metres – 3,316 feet), the Garlaban and Alpilles massifs.

Seismic activity
The department of Bouches-du-Rhône is also known for its seismic activity: the zone II ("average seismic activity") townships of Lambesc Peyrolles-en-Provence and Salon-de-Provence are the most exposed.

Areas Ib ("low seismic activity") including the cantons of Aix-en-Provence, Trets Eyguières, Orgon, Berre-Pond, Istres, Istres-North and South, and Ia areas ("very low seismic activity") including the other cantons in the district of Aix-en-Provence, Arles-East, Châteaurenard, Saint-Rémy-de-Provence, Marignane, Martigues-East and Roquevaire-West, are least exposed. Zone 0 ("negligible seismic activity") includes the rest of the department.

Climate
The department has a Mediterranean climate, with contrasting temperatures within a range of 15 degrees. Precipitation is irregular, with only 65 days per year where rain falls in excess of 1 mm. However it falls in sudden downpours, with an average of  annually. This mainly happens in the spring and autumn; summer is very hot, winter mild. The coast is drier, especially along the Côte Bleue, the Calanques and the bay of La Ciotat, which include some of the driest areas in France, with only  of rain per year. Higher areas receive more precipitation and lower temperatures. The Arc region in the interior is much colder than other areas, with heavy frosts in winter.

Demographics

Principal towns

The most populous commune is Marseille, the prefecture. As of 2019, there are 14 communes with more than 20,000 inhabitants:

There are 15 more communes with over 10,000 inhabitants: Châteauneuf-les-Martigues, Port-de-Bouc, Châteaurenard, Tarascon, Fos-sur-Mer, Bouc-Bel-Air, Berre-l'Étang, Saint-Martin-de-Crau, Auriol, Rognac, Plan-de-Cuques, Septèmes-les-Vallons, Pélissanne, Trets and Fuveau.

Politics

History

Since Bouches-du-Rhône is one of the most populous and diverse departments of France, it has long been the scene of particularly fierce political battles. The development of the Marseille-Fos Port, the relationship maintained between France and its colonial empire, the industry around coal mining in Provence, as well as significant immigration, especially coming from Italy, from the end the 19th century and during the period between the two world wars are all factors that led to the emergence of a large and militant working class. From the late 19th century, the socialist movement gained influence, such as in 1881 by the election of the country's first socialist member of parliament, Clovis Hugues. Rural areas, particularly in the region of Aix-en-Provence, have tended to favour the influence of right-wing parties, including monarchists and Catholics at the beginning of the French Third Republic. The interwar period and the time of the Popular Front marked the beginning of the dominance of the left in the department, first with the election of the French Section of the Workers' International (SFIO).

After the Second World War, the Marseillais right, linked to the underworld and who collaborated with the German occupation, was widely discredited. The left largely dominated the Liberation and Marseille even saw the election in 1946 of Communist Mayor Jean Cristofol. In 1947 the SFIO led an alliance with right and centre parties against the Communists, resulting six years later in the election of Gaston Defferre as Mayor of Marseille, a position he held until his death in 1986. The dominance of socialism was, however, challenged by deindustrialisation. The conservative success in 1995 by Jean-Claude Gaudin in Marseille is a symbol of widespread political shifts while even the former communists bastions of La Ciotat and Port-Saint-Louis-du-Rhône voted for the right. The 1990s saw the rise of the National Front, including its victories in municipal elections of Marignane and Vitrolles.

The President of the Departmental Council has been Martine Vassal of the right-wing The Republicans party since 2015, after former Socialist President Jean-Noël Guérini was voted out of office and has faced corruption charges.

In the 2022 French presidential election, just like five years prior, Marine Le Pen of the National Rally (formerly National Front) won a majority in Bouches-du-Rhône in the first round, before incumbent Emmanuel Macron of La République En Marche! won a majority in the second round.

Members of the National Assembly
Bouches-du-Rhône elected the following members of the National Assembly in the 2017 legislative election:

Departmental Council of Bouches-du-Rhône

Below is a list of seats won by the department's different parties after the 2015 departmental elections.

Culture 

The department is well represented in French art. Paul Cézanne painted numerous representations of the Mont Sainte-Victoire. Vincent van Gogh spent two years in Arles, painting many scenes in the area. The department's main museums include the Museum of European and Mediterranean Civilisations, the Musée de la Faïence de Marseille and the Marseille History Museum.

Tourism

Main sights
Major sites of tourism include:
 The cities of Marseille and Aix-en-Provence
 Roman and Romanesque monuments of Arles
 The Camargue and the town of Saintes-Maries-de-la-Mer
 Alphonse Daudet's windmill in Fontvieille
 Les Baux-de-Provence, medieval village
 Saint-Rémy-de-Provence and the ruins of the Roman city of Glanum
 Tarascon, medieval castle and church
 Salon-de-Provence, city of Nostradamus and one of the biggest citadels in Provence: Château de l'Empéri
 The Calanque de Sormiou, Marseille

Natural landmarks
Rivers include:
 The Rhône, which forms the border with the department of Gard
 The Durance, which forms the border with the department of Vaucluse
 The Arc
 The Huveaune

Lakes include:
 Étang de Berre
 Étang de Vaccarès, in the Camargue

Mountains include:
 Alpilles mountain range
 Calanques between Marseille and La Ciotat
 Corniche des Crêtes
 Garlaban
 Mont Puget
 Montagne Sainte-Victoire
 Sainte-Baume massif

See also
 Cantons of the Bouches-du-Rhône department
 Communes of the Bouches-du-Rhône department
 Arrondissements of the Bouches-du-Rhône department
 List of senators of Bouches-du-Rhône
 Bouches-du-Rhône Police Prefecture

Sources

External links

  Prefecture website
  Departmental Council website

 
1790 establishments in France
Provence-Alpes-Côte d'Azur region articles needing translation from French Wikipedia
Departments of Provence-Alpes-Côte d'Azur
States and territories established in 1790